The 2019–20 Santa Clara Broncos men's basketball team represented Santa Clara University during the 2019–20 NCAA Division I men's basketball season. The Broncos were led by fourth-year head coach Herb Sendek and played their home games at the Leavey Center as members of the West Coast Conference. They finished the season 20–13, 6–10 in WCC play to finish in seventh place. They defeated Portland in the first round of the WCC tournament before losing in the second round to Pepperdine.

Previous season
The Broncos finished the 2018–19 season 16–15, 8–8 in WCC play to finish in a tie for fourth place. They lost in the second round of the WCC tournament to San Diego.

Departures

Incoming Transfers

Recruiting

Roster

Schedule and results

|-
!colspan=9 style=| Non-conference regular season

|-
!colspan=9 style=| WCC regular season

|-
!colspan=9 style=| WCC tournament

Source:

References

Santa Clara Broncos men's basketball seasons
Santa Clara
Santa Clara
Santa Clara